George Edward Seals (October 2, 1942 – May 6, 2022) was an American football offensive and defensive lineman in the National Football League for the Washington Redskins, Chicago Bears, and the Kansas City Chiefs.

Biography
Seals was born in Higginsville, Missouri. He played college football at the University of Missouri and was drafted in the fourth round of the 1964 NFL Draft by the New York Giants.  Seals was also selected in the eighth round of the 1964 AFL Draft by the San Diego Chargers. His son Dan Seals lost to Mark Kirk in 2006 and 2008 and also lost to Bob Dold in 2010 for the 10th District of Illinois' Congressional seat.

References

1942 births
2022 deaths
American football defensive linemen
American football offensive linemen
Missouri Tigers football players
Washington Redskins players
Chicago Bears players
Kansas City Chiefs players
People from Higginsville, Missouri